Arnold George Weinmeister (March 23, 1923 – June 28, 2000) was a Canadian professional football player who was a defensive tackle.  He went to four Pro Bowls, but with only a six-year tenure in the All-America Football Conference and National Football League combined, his career is one of the shortest of any Pro Football Hall of Fame member. He also played in the Canadian Football League. He was born in Rhein, Saskatchewan.

Early years
Weinmeister was a two-time All-City tackle in high school, and played end, fullback and tackle during a 4-year tenure at the University of Washington which was interrupted by four years of army service. He was scouted by New York Yankees (AAFC) head coach Ray Flaherty while playing fullback.

Professional career
Weinmeister turned professional in 1948 and played defensive tackle for the New York Yankees in the All-America Football Conference until 1949, and for the New York Giants from 1950 to 1953. During his final season in New York, he served as the team captain. In 1949, Weinmeister won second-team All-AAFC as a rookie followed by first-team All-AAFC honors, was voted All-NFL Choice for four consecutive years (1950–1953), and was selected to play in the NFL's Pro Bowl every year from 1950 to 1953.

He was on the inaugural roster for the BC Lions in 1954, and played for the team for two seasons. He is one of five Saskatchewan natives to make it to the NFL (the other four being Jon Ryan, Rueben Mayes, Ben Heenan, and Brett Jones).

References

External links

Pro Football Hall of Fame: member biography
 Professional Football Researchers Association article

1923 births
2000 deaths
American football defensive tackles
United States Army personnel of World War II
BC Lions players
Canadian players of American football
Canadian people of German descent
Eastern Conference Pro Bowl players
New York Giants players
New York Yankees (AAFC) players
Players of Canadian football from Saskatchewan
Pro Football Hall of Fame inductees
Sportspeople from Saskatchewan
Washington Huskies football players